Golf Films is a franchise of films produced by Golf Channel, which originated in 1995 as the first U.S. single-sport cable network, co-founded by golf legend Arnold Palmer.  The biographical features in the Golf Films library cover a wide range of key figures and events that have changed the game in unique ways, in particular over the last century.

Background 
Golf Channel is an American pay television network owned by the NBC Sports Group subsidiary of NBCUniversal division of Comcast. The channel focuses on coverage of the sport of golf, including live coverage of tournaments, as well as news and instructional programming.

The Golf Films franchise is a collection of independently produced biographical films that center around key figures and events in the history of golf.    

Each Golf Films production is typically released at a time that matches its significance and correlation with a current major championship/event.  Recently,  “Famous 5” premiered on September 24, 2018, just days before the beginning of the 2018 Ryder Cup in Paris, France, which was aired on NBC and Golf Channel.  “Famous 5” focused on a group of five European golfers – all born within 11 months of one another – who helped revitalize the Ryder Cup and redefine the professional golf landscape.

List of Golf Films 

“Famous 5” outlines how five European golfers – born within 11 months of one another – helped revitalize the Ryder Cup and redefine the professional golf landscape. The film also details how the five (Seve Ballesteros, Nick Faldo, Bernhard Langer, Sandy Lyle, Ian Woosnam) would go on to World Golf Hall of Fame careers, led by 16-combined major championships and a No. 1 world ranking (all but Lyle).  

"Go Down Swinging: The 1999 Open at Carnoustie" recounts the 1999 Open when Jean van de Velde surrendered what seemed like inevitable victory with a three-shot lead on the 72nd hole.

"Summer of '76" 

"Jack" is a biopic on record 18-time major champion and World Golf Hall of Fame member Jack Nicklaus.

"Countdown to Rio" prepared viewers for golf's return to the Olympic Games in 2016 for the first time in 112 years. The special details the sport's journey back to becoming an Olympic sport, including the reaction from the vote in October 2009 that finalized the sport's reinstatement into the Games. The subsequent elements include the events that would follow ahead of the 2016 Rio Olympics, including: The bidding process for designing the Olympic golf course venue and the challenges that the winning architect – Gil Hanse – would face in preparing the course for competition.

"86" is a  commemoration of the 30-year anniversary of Jack Nicklaus’  30th anniversary historic 18th and final major championship in the 1986 Masters. 

“Ben Crenshaw: A Walk Through Augusta” serves as a retrospective on the life and career of Ben Crenshaw.

"Arnie & Me" consists largely of videos recounting random meetings with Palmer. The stories are told by the fans, with no narration.

An Emmy-nominated film commemorating Payne Stewart on the 15th anniversary of his victory in the 1999 U.S. Open.

"Arnie" features interviews with more than 100 people, all weighing in on Palmer's contributions to sports and society. 

"Lee Trevino: An American Champion" recounts Lee Trevino’s playoff victory in the 1971 U.S. Open over Jack Nicklaus, featuring retrospective interviews with both World Golf Hall of Fame members. The film details the impoverished childhood of Trevino, a Mexican-American eighth grade dropout.

"Go Annika" commemorates the historic moment when Annika Sorenstam became the first woman in the modern professional golf era to test her mettle amongst the men in the 2003 PGA Tour event at Colonial Country Club. The film details how and why the World Golf Hall of Fame member and best female golfer of her generation came to play in the tournament, revealing the immense pressure she felt and how it changed her outlook on her life and career forever. Longtime golf writer Ron Sirak summed up Annika's foray into men's golf.  “She entered the Bank of America Colonial as a female golfer and left it as a golfer,” Sirak wrote. “She entered it as a reluctant superstar and left it as a one-word celebrity.” (3) "Go Annika" also incorporates Sorenstam's return visit to Colonial a decade later, where (to her surprise) she is reunited with her playing partners from 2003 – Aaron Barber and Dean Wilson – for a casual round of golf to reminisce about their experience together inside the ropes.

"American Triumvirate" 

"Uneven Fairways" chronicles the story of the African-American golfers.

Timing of the Premiere Dates 
The release date of the productions often coincided with major golf events that were contested at the same time.  Some dates relate to other newsworthy events at a particular time. Below is the list of premiere dates and their significance.

References 

Golf Channel original programming
Golf films
American documentary television series
Television film series
Documentaries about sports